Otakon is an annual three-day anime convention held during July/August. It stands for Otaku Convention. From 1999 to 2016, it took place at the Baltimore Convention Center in Baltimore, Maryland's Inner Harbor district; in 2017, it moved to the Walter E. Washington Convention Center in Washington, D.C. The convention focuses on East Asian popular culture (primarily anime, manga, music, and cinema) and its fandom. The name is a portmanteau derived from convention and the Japanese word otaku.

Otakorp
Otakon is run by the Pennsylvania-based non-profit organization Otakorp, Inc. whose primary purpose "is to promote the appreciation of Asian culture, primarily through its media and entertainment".

Programming
Typical Otakon programming includes anime and live action East Asian films shown on big screens in multiple video rooms. Fan-produced content including fan-parodies and anime music videos (AMVs) are also shown. For several years, Otakon had a dedicated 35 mm film theater, but replaced it in 2008 with an HD theater to take advantage of the wider array of offerings in that format. Panels and workshops are held on subjects such as voice acting, how to draw manga, and Japanese culture. Industry professionals announce new acquisitions, and expert guests discuss or show tricks of their trade and field questions from the audience. Many panels and workshops are conducted by fans rather than pros (ex. Create a Comic Project). The convention also includes cosplay and a skit-based Masquerade show, which in the years before the convention moved to Washington D.C. had taken place inside the Royal Farms Arena.

History
Otakon 2020 was cancelled due to its venue, the Walter E. Washington Convention Center, being converted to a field hospital to treat COVID-19 patients during the ongoing pandemic.

Event history

Locations

The first Otakon was held at a Days Inn in State College, Pennsylvania in 1994; 350 people attended.

Baltimore

From 1999 to 2016, Otakon was held at the Baltimore Convention Center in Baltimore, Maryland. In 2011, the Baltimore city tourism agency, Visit Baltimore, gave Otakon a "Customer of the Year" award for "demonstrat[ing] ongoing commitment to Baltimore, bringing more than 27,000 attendees to the city every year, a much-anticipated event by the local community and media". Otakon has been a top convention for Baltimore since 2003. Otakon 2009 had an economic impact of $12.5 million in direct spending and booked over 4,500 hotel rooms. According to the Baltimore Business Journal on December 10, 2010, Otakon 2010 had 4,575 booked hotel rooms and an estimated economic impact of $15.3 million, up from $12.5 million the year before; in particular it had significant impact on food vendors.

Washington, DC
Beginning in 2017, Otakon moved to Washington, DC, to the Walter E. Washington Convention Center.

Las Vegas

From 2014 to 2018, a spin-off convention also run by Otakorp had been held in January at the Planet Hollywood Resort and Casino in Las Vegas, Nevada. In 2018, shortly after the end of Otakon Vegas 2018, Otakorp, Inc. announced on the Otakon Vegas website that Otakon Vegas was going on hiatus for an undetermined amount of time and that Otakon Vegas 2018 would be the last Otakon Vegas held. Otakorp, Inc. described Otakon Vegas as being an "experiment" and stated that they were "taking some time to examine the results of this experiment, to rethink and reorganize the show logistics, and to determine how best to bring the show forward." They left the door open for a future Otakon Vegas by concluding that they "hope to return to Vegas in the future.""

Notes

References

External links

Otakon.com

Anime conventions in the United States
Recurring events established in 1994
1994 establishments in Pennsylvania
Annual events in Maryland
Festivals in Baltimore
Tourist attractions in Baltimore
Conventions in Maryland